The 1986 Australian Formula 2 Championship was a CAMS sanctioned Australian motor racing title open to cars complying with Australian Formula 2 regulations. The title, which was the 18th Australian Formula 2 Championship, was won by Peter Glover, driving a Cheetah Mk.8 Volkswagen.

Calendar
The championship was contested over a nine round series.

Points system
Points were awarded to the first 20 placegetters in each race as per the following table:

 Where a round was contested over multiple heats, each driver's points were aggregated and then divided by the number of heats to determine the championship points allocation for that round.
 Only the best eight round results counted towards a driver's total.

Championship results

Note: The above table lists only the top ten championship positions.

References

Australian Formula 2 Championship
Formula 2 Championship